The Obic Seagulls are an American football team located in the Narashino, Chiba, Japan.  They are a member of the X-League. The Obic Seagulls have won over 17 championships during their team history (8 Rice Bowl championships and 9 Japan X Bowl championships) the most of any American football team in Japan.

Team history
1983 Team founded as the "Recruit Seagulls"
1989 Promoted from X2 to X1
1995 Won first Division Title 
1996 Won first league and national title.
1998 Won second league and national title.
1999 Following an economic downturn, the team transitioned from a corporate team under Recruit Co., Ltd., to a club team.
2002 Recruit withdraws team sponsorship. Team became a self-supporting club team under the name "Seagulls".
2003 Obic Co., Ltd., becomes new team sponsor. Team name changed to Obic Seagulls. 
2005 Won third League and national title.
2012 Went on record as being the 1st club team in Japan (Among currently registered X-League teams) to play in an international exhibition game (Germany/Dresden Monarchs). 
2013 Played in an international exhibition game in Dusseldorf, Germany vs. the Dusseldorf Panthers. Became the first Japanese team to win 4 consecutive national championships dating back to 2010.
2014 Played in a sister cities international exhibition game in Tuscaloosa, Alabama, U.S.A. vs. the APDFL(Amateur to Professional Developmental Football League) Blazers.

Seasons
{| class="wikitable"
|bgcolor="#FFCCCC"|X-League Champions (1987–present)
|bgcolor="#DDFFDD"|<small>Division Champions</small>
|bgcolor="#D0E7FF"|Final Stage/Semifinals Berth
|bgcolor="#96CDCD"|Wild Card /2nd Stage Berth
|}

Head coaches

Current Import PlayersFormer Import players'''

References

External links
  (Japanese)

Recruit (company)
American football in Japan
1983 establishments in Japan
American football teams established in 1983
X-League teams